Damajadaśri I (circa 170–175 CE) was a ruler of the Western Kshatrapas dynasty. He was the son of Rudradaman I.

His reign saw the decline of dynasty after his dominions were conquered by the Satavahanas and saw the rise of the Abhiras in the south and Malavas in the north. He is also known as Damaysada, Damazada or Damaghsada. Jha and Rajgor considers Damajadasri and Damazada different persons. Tandon thinks they are one and the same, and his name should be read Dāmazāda.

References 

Western Satraps
2nd-century Indian monarchs